John Davys Beresford (17 March 1873 – 2 February 1947) was an English writer, now remembered for his early science fiction and some short stories in the horror story and ghost story genres. Beresford was a great admirer of H.G. Wells, and wrote the first critical study of Wells in 1915. His Wellsian novel The Hampdenshire Wonder was a major influence on Olaf Stapledon. His other science-fiction novels include The Riddle of the Tower, about a dystopian, hive-like society.

Life
His father, John James Beresford (1821 - 1897), was a clergyman in Castor, now in Cambridgeshire near Peterborough. His mother was Adelaide Elizabeth Morgan (1837 - 1902). J. D. Beresford was affected by infantile paralysis, which left him partially disabled. He was educated at Oundle.

After training to become an architect, he became a professional writer, first as a dramatist, and journalist. In early adulthood, he broke away from his father's views and became a "determined but defensive" agnostic. He combined a prominent place in Edwardian literary London with time spent in the provinces, in particular Cornwall, where D. H. Lawrence had an extended stay in his Porthcothan cottage. Later in life Beresford abandoned his earlier agnosticism and described himself as a Theosophist and a pacifist.

Beresford was also interested in psychology, and attended several meetings organised by A.R. Orage to discuss psychological issues. Other attendees at these meetings included Havelock Ellis, Clifford Sharp, David Eder and Maurice Nicoll.

Beresford also contributed to numerous publications; in addition to being a book reviewer for The Manchester Guardian, he also wrote for the New Statesman, The Spectator, Westminster Gazette, and the Theosophist magazine The Aryan Path. At one point, Beresford was offered the editorship of the pacifist magazine Peace News but declined because he felt he "would be a bad editor".

Beresford's interest in the spiritual and philosophical may be best illustrated by the publisher notes to his novel, On A Huge Hill:

"Mr Beresford's readers have long known that that for him there are more things in heaven or earth than are dreamt of in official medical philosophy. He has used his novelist's skill to convince the sensitive reader that the age of miracles is not over, and that, in certain circumstances, the spirit may exercise what seem to us miraculous powers over the substance of the body. This he did in 'The Camberwell Miracle' and 'Peckover'; and in this absorbing novel, he returns to the theme, with the study of a man fitting himself to become a great healer."

Dorothy L. Sayers quotes from Beresford's essay "Writing Aloud" in her book on theology, Mind of the Maker. She also mentions him in passing in Whose Body?.

George Orwell in 1945 described him as a "natural novelist", whose strength, particularly in A Candidate for Truth, was his ability to take seriously the problems of ordinary people.

Elisabeth Beresford (1926–2010), children's writer and creator of The Wombles, was his daughter. Through his son, writer Marc Brandel (Marcus Beresford), he is the great-grandfather of American actor James Newman.

He was married twice, first to Florence Linda Brown (1870 - 1916) and then to Eveline "Trissy" Beatrice Auford Roskams (1880 - 1975)

Works

The Early History of Jacob Stahl (1911), the first of a trilogy of novels with A Candidate for Truth and The Invisible Event
The Hampdenshire Wonder (1911) Novel
A Candidate for Truth (1912)
Goslings: A World of Women (1913) Novel
The House in Demetrius Road (1914) Novel
The Invisible Event (1915) Novel
H.G. Wells (1915) criticism
These Lynneskers (1916) Novel
William Elphinstone Ford (1917) biography, with Kenneth Richmond
House Mates (1917) Novel
Nineteen Impressions (1918) stories
God's Counterpoint (1918) Novel
The Jervaise Comedy (1919) Novel
The Imperfect Mother (1920) Novel
Signs and Wonders (1921, Golden Cockerel Press) stories
Revolution (1921) Novel
The Prisoners of Hartling (1922) Novel
The Imperturbable Duchess and Other Stories (1923)
Monkey Puzzle (1925)
That Kind of Man, or Almost Pagan (1926) Novel
The Decoy (1927) Novel
The Instrument of Destiny (1928) mystery novel
All or Nothing (1928) Novel
Real People (1929) Novel
The Meeting Place and Other Stories (1929)
Love's Illusion (1930)
The Next Generation (1932) Novel
The Old People (1932) Novel
The Camberwell Miracle (1933) novel
Peckover (1934) Novel
On a Huge Hill (1935) Novel
Blackthorn Winter and other stories (1936)
Cleo (1937) Novel
What Dreams May Come (1941) Novel
A Common Enemy (1941) Novel
Men in the Same Boat (1943) (with Esmé Wynne-Tyson)
The Riddle of the Tower (1944) (with Esmé Wynne-Tyson)
The Gift (1947) (with Esmé Wynne-Tyson)
The Prisoner
Love's Pilgrim
The Tapestry

References

Further reading
Frank Swinnerton, "Oliver Onions and J.D. Beresford", in The Georgian literary scene, 1910–1935. London, : London, Heinemann (1935).
 George M. Johnson, “J.D. Beresford.” Dictionary of Literary Biography.  British Short-Fiction Writers 1915–1945. Ed. John H. Rogers. Detroit: Gale Research (1996).
Richard Bleiler,  "John Davys Beresford" in Darren Harris-Fain, ed. British Fantasy and Science Fiction Writers Before World War I. Detroit, MI: Gale Research, (1997).
 George M. Johnson, J.D. Beresford  New York : Twayne Publishers. (1998)
George M. Johnson, “J.D. Beresford.” Dictionary of Literary Biography.  Late-Victorian and Edwardian British Novelists, Second Series. Ed. George M. Johnson. Detroit: Gale Research, (1999).
George M. Johnson, Dynamic Psychology in Modernist British Fiction.  Palgrave Macmillan, U.K., 2006.
 George M. Johnson, “The Other Side of Edwardian Fiction: Two Forgotten Fantasy Novels of 1911.” Wormwood: Literature of the fantastic, supernatural and decadent. U.K., No. 16 (Spring 2011) 3-15.
 George M. Johnson, “Evil is in the Eye of the Beholder: Threatening Children in Two Edwardian Speculative Satires.” Science Fiction Studies. Vol. 41, No.1 (March 2014): 26–44.

External links
 
 
 
 J. D. Beresford, The Online Books Page, University of Pennsylvania

 
Digitized works by J. D. Beresford at Toronto Public Library
Play by J. D. Beresford and Kenneth Richmond on Great War Theatre

1873 births
1947 deaths
English science fiction writers
English short story writers
English pacifists
English Theosophists
People from Peterborough
People educated at Oundle School
People educated at The King's School, Peterborough
English male novelists